Bunk: The Rise of Hoaxes, Humbug, Plagiarists, Phonies, Post-Facts, and Fake News is a 2017 book by Kevin Young that examines the history of hoaxes and fake news. The book has seven "positive" reviews, nine "rave" reviews, and two "mixed" reviews, according to review aggregator Book Marks.

References

2017 non-fiction books
English-language books
Graywolf Press books
Fake news